The brown pipistrelle (Hypsugo imbricatus) is a species of vesper bat in the family Vespertilionidae. It is found in Indonesia and Malaysia.

References

Hypsugo
Taxonomy articles created by Polbot
Bats of Southeast Asia
Mammals described in 1824
Taxa named by Thomas Horsfield
Taxobox binomials not recognized by IUCN